Tufan Özbozkurt (born 20 March 1993) is a Turkish footballer who plays for TEC in the Tweede Divisie. He made his professional debut as Jong PSV player in the Eerste Divisie on 3 August 2013 against Sparta Rotterdam.

Career
Since leaving Jong FC Utrecht in the summer 2018, Özbozkurt was left without club. In October 2019, he went on a trial at SV Spakenburg. Later in October 2019, he joined FC Lienden. At the end of November 2019, he suffered from a knee injury which later required a surgery in the anterior cruciate ligament.

Private life
Özbozkurt is a very near friend of Memphis Depay, whom he has known since his time in PSV Eindhoven.

References

External links
 
 
 

1993 births
Living people
Footballers from Utrecht (city)
Turkish footballers
Turkey youth international footballers
Dutch people of Turkish descent
Dutch footballers
Netherlands youth international footballers
Jong PSV players
Konyaspor footballers
1922 Konyaspor footballers
Jong FC Utrecht players
FC Lienden players
TFF Second League players
Eerste Divisie players
Derde Divisie players
Association football midfielders
Tweede Divisie players
SV TEC players